Muhammad Yusuf Islahi (9 July 1932 – 21 December 2021) was an Indian Islamic scholar and writer.

Islahi was born in Attock, British India, on 9 July 1932. His early education took place in Bareilly, including Hifz-e-Qur'an and Tajweed, before he attended high school at Islamia Inter College, in Bareilly. He then enrolled in Mazahirul Uloom Saharanpur, and studied for several years, before entering Madrasat-ul-Islah. He died on 21 December 2021, at the age of 89 in rampur UP.

References 

1932 births
2021 deaths
20th-century Indian Muslims
20th-century Indian writers
People from Attock District
Mazahir Uloom alumni